Lina Andersson (born March 18, 1981 in Malmberget) is a Swedish cross-country skier who has competed since 1998. She won a gold medal in the Team sprint (with Anna Dahlberg) at the 2006 Winter Olympics in Turin and also finished 11th in the Individual sprint in those same games.

Andersson also won three medals at the FIS Nordic World Ski Championships with two silvers (Individual sprint: 2005, team sprint: 2009) and a bronze (4 × 5 km relay: 2009). She also has nineteen individual victories at all levels at various distances since 1999.

Cross-country skiing results
All results are sourced from the International Ski Federation (FIS).

Olympic Games
 1 medal – (1 gold)

World Championships
3 medals – (2 silver, 1 bronze)

a.  Cancelled due to extremely cold weather.

World Cup

Season standings

Individual podiums
 2 victories – (2 )
 7 podiums – (7 )

Team podiums
 1 victory – (1 )
 6 podiums – (4 , 2 )

References

External links

 
 
 

1981 births
Living people
People from Gällivare Municipality
Cross-country skiers from Norrbotten County
Cross-country skiers at the 2002 Winter Olympics
Cross-country skiers at the 2006 Winter Olympics
Olympic cross-country skiers of Sweden
Olympic gold medalists for Sweden
Olympic medalists in cross-country skiing
Swedish female cross-country skiers
FIS Nordic World Ski Championships medalists in cross-country skiing
Medalists at the 2006 Winter Olympics
Piteå Elit skiers